Spezand is a town and Union Council of Mastung District in the Balochistan province of Pakistan. It is located at 29°58'60N 67°0'0E and has an altitude of 1795 metres (5892 feet).

Transport 

Spezand is the junction where the railway to Zahedan branches off the railway to Quetta.

See also 

Railway stations in Pakistan

References 

Populated places in Mastung District